Carnie! (also spelled without an exclamation mark as Carnie and also referred as The Carnie Wilson Show) is an American daytime talk show hosted by Carnie Wilson that aired for one season from 1995 until 1996. The program was a production of Telepictures Productions, distributed by Warner Bros. Domestic Television Distribution.

Carnie! premiered on September 4, 1995 and was one of several talk shows with first time hosts that premiered that fall. Although Wilson drew higher ratings than all of the newcomers, like them the show did not do well enough to last and Carnie! was cancelled at midseason. New episodes aired until February 23, 1996, with reruns following until June 7. In most of its markets, Carnie! was replaced by The Rosie O'Donnell Show.

Former Cosmopolitan Bachelor-of-the-Month Chris Greeley was a guest on the television pilot.

References

External links
Carnie! at the Internet Movie Database

1995 American television series debuts
1996 American television series endings
1990s American television talk shows
English-language television shows
First-run syndicated television programs in the United States